Petria's Wreath, is a 1980 Yugoslav film directed by Srđan Karanović. It won the Big Golden Arena for Best Film, with Mirjana Karanović picking up the Golden Arena for Best Actress at the 1980 Pula Film Festival. Set in a small mining town in Serbia, before, during and after World War II, it follows the life of an illiterate woman. The film marks the acting debut of Mirjana Karanović.

References

External links

1980 films
Yugoslav drama films
Serbo-Croatian-language films
Serbian drama films
Films directed by Srđan Karanović
Films set in Serbia
Films set in Yugoslavia
Films based on Serbian novels